The National League for Democracy (abbr. NLD; Burmese abbr. ဒီချုပ်) is a liberal democratic political party in Myanmar (Burma). It became the country's ruling party after a landslide victory in the 2015 general election but was overthrown in a military coup d'état in early 2021 following another landslide election victory in 2020.

Founded on 27 September 1988, it has become one of the most influential parties in Myanmar's pro-democracy movement. Aung San Suu Kyi, the former State Counsellor of Myanmar, serves as its chairperson. The party won a substantial parliamentary majority in the 1990 Myanmar general election. However, the ruling military junta refused to recognise the result. On 6 May 2010, the party was declared illegal and ordered to be disbanded by the junta after refusing to register for the elections slated for November 2010. In November 2011, the NLD announced its intention to register as a political party to contend future elections, and Myanmar's Union Election Commission approved their application for registration on 13 December 2011.

In the 2012 by-elections, the NLD contested 44 of the 45 available seats, winning 43, with its only loss being in one seat to the SNDP. Party leader Aung San Suu Kyi won the seat of Kawhmu. In the 2015 general election, the NLD won a supermajority in both houses of the Assembly, paving the way for the country's first non-military president in 54 years. The NLD is an observer party of the Council of Asian Liberals and Democrats.

On 21 May 2021, the junta's Union Election Committee announced plans to permanently dissolve the NLD, though the junta later reversed this decision, with spokesman Zaw Min Tun saying that the NLD will decide whether to stand in the next general election. After the junta enacted a new electoral law in January 2023 designed to favor the USDP, the NLD announced it would not re-register as a political party and would not recognize the results of any election held by the junta.

History
The NLD was formed in the aftermath of the 8888 Uprising, a series of protests in favour of democracy which took place in 1990 and was ended when the military again took control of the country in a coup. It formed under the leadership of Aung San Suu Kyi, daughter of Aung San, a pivotal figure in the Burmese independence movement of the 1940s. She was recruited by concerned democracy advocates. The first founding chair is Brigadier General Aung Gyi and Aung San Suu Kyi is the General Secretary of the Party.

In the 1990 parliamentary elections, the party took 59% of the vote and won 392 out of 492 contested seats, compared to 10 seats won by the governing National Unity Party. However, the ruling military junta (formerly SLORC, later known as the State Peace and Development Council or SPDC) did not let the party form a government. Soon after the election, the party was repressed and in 1996 Suu Kyi was placed under house arrest. This was her status for 16 of the following 21 years until her release on 13 November 2010. A number of senior NLD members escaped arrest, however, and formed the National Coalition Government of the Union of Burma (NCGUB).

In 2001, the government permitted NLD office branches to re-open throughout Burma and freed some imprisoned members. In May 2002, NLD's general secretary, Aung San Suu Kyi was again released from house arrest. She and other NLD members made numerous trips throughout the country and received support from the public. However, on their trip to Depayin township in May 2003, dozens of NLD members were shot and killed in a military sponsored massacre. Its general secretary, Aung San Suu Kyi and Party's Vice President, U Tin Oo were again arrested.

From 2004, the government prohibited the activities of the party. In 2006, many members resigned from NLD, citing harassment and pressure from the Tatmadaw (Armed Forces) and the Union Solidarity and Development Association. In October 2008, following the crackdown on the aftermath of the Saffron Revolution a bomb exploded in the Htan Chauk Pin quarter of the Shwepyitha Township of Yangon, near the office of the military junta-backed Union Solidarity and Development Association killing one. The victim was identified as Thet Oo Win, a former Buddhist monk who participated in the Saffron Revolution, was killed while improvising the bomb at his own residence. The junta blamed the National League for Democracy party of planting that bomb, but experts believed at the time that the opposition was not in a position to carry out such acts amidst the tightly controlled security environment. The junta detained several members of the party in connection with the bombings that year.

The NLD boycotted the general election held in November 2010 because many of its most prominent members were barred from standing. The laws were designed in such a way that the party would have had to expel these members to be allowed to run. This decision, taken in May, led to the party being officially banned. A splinter group named the National Democratic Force broke away from the NLD to contest the elections, but secured less than 3% of the vote. The election was won in a landslide by the military-backed USDP and was described by U.S. President Barack Obama as "stolen".

Discussions were held between Suu Kyi and the Burmese government during 2011, which led to a number of official gestures to meet her demands. In October, around a tenth of Myanmar's political prisoners were freed in an amnesty and trade unions were legalised.

On 18 November 2011, following a meeting of its leaders, the NLD announced its intention to re-register as a political party in order to contend in 48 by-elections necessitated by the promotion of parliamentarians to ministerial rank. Following the decision, Suu Kyi held a telephone conference with Barack Obama, in which it was agreed that U.S. Secretary of State Hillary Clinton would make a visit to Myanmar, a move received with caution by Burma's ally China. The visit took place on 30 November. European Union Vice President Catherine Ashton welcomed the possibility of "fair and transparent" elections in Burma, and said that the EU would be reviewing its foreign policy towards the country.

The party was criticised for discouraging Muslim candidates during preparations for the 2015 elections, a step seen as related to its desire to keep good relations with hardline Buddhist monks such as the Ma Ba Tha association. Ko Ni, a legal advisor to the party and a Muslim, was assassinated in January 2017. The party has also been criticized by international media outlets for its lack of response to renewed military-led violence against the Rohingya beginning in 2016, as well as for "doing little to address the country’s weak rule of law, corrupt judiciary, or impunity for security force abuses" with the power they had (although several national institutions remain dominated by the military).

In the aftermath of the 2021 Myanmar coup d'état, NLD offices were occupied and raided by police authorities, starting on 2 February. Documents, computers and laptops were forcibly seized, and the NLD called these raids unlawful. On 9 February, police raided the NLD headquarters in Yangon.

Ideology 
The NLD is described as liberal, democratic-liberal, liberal-conservative, and social-liberal. 

The NLD supports populism and protectionist economic policies. Historically, the NLD has been a social-democratic party.

Party platform

The party advocates a non-violent movement towards multi-party democracy in Myanmar, which was under military rule from 1962 to 2011. The party also claims to support human rights (including broad-based freedom of speech), the rule of law, and national reconciliation.

Aung San Suu Kyi also claimed amendments to the constitution of 2008, drafted with the input of the armed forces. She stated that its mandatory granting of 25% of seats in parliament to appointed military representatives is undemocratic.

Party symbols
The party flag features the peacock, a prominent symbol of Myanmar. The dancing peacock (the peacock in courtship or in display of its feathers) was frequently featured in Burmese monarchic flags as well as other nationalist symbols in the country. The fighting peacock is associated with the decades-long democratic struggle against military dictatorship in the country. The latter closely resembles a green peafowl, as it has a tufted crest. The NLD party symbol is adopted from the Myanmar (Burmese) Student Union flag. This student union organised since the uprising against British colonial rule in Burma, years before the independence of Burma in 1948, had played a major political role in Burma and Aung San Suu Kyi's late father Bogyoke Aung San (General Aung San) was one of the former presidents of the Rangoon University Student Union.

The party emblem is a traditional bamboo hat.

Election results

Burmese Constitutional Committee

House of Nationalities (Amyotha Hluttaw)

House of Representatives (Pyithu Hluttaw)

State and Regional Hluttaws

Women's Committee
NLD Women's Committee is the committee of NLD women and provided legal and social assistance to women in need. Women’s Work Committees have been formed at all administrative levels, including region and state, ward, and village. The chairman of the Central Women’s Committee is May Win Myint

See also

References

Bibliography

 Houtman, Gustaaf. Daigaku, Tōkyō Gaikokugo. Kenkyūjo, Ajia Afurika Gengo Bunka. Mental culture in Burmese crisis politics: Aung San Suu Kyi and the National League for Democracy. ILCAA, 1999. .

External links

Official website of the National League for Democracy Party 
Official website of Aung San Su Kyi
National League for Democracy (Liberated Area) (Archived from the original on 19 January 2012)
National League for Democracy (Burma) (Archived from the original on 18 June 2013)
Aung San Suu Kyi's pages (Inactive website. No new activity since July 2014.)
The National Coalition Government of the Union of Burma Website

1988 establishments in Burma
Aung San Suu Kyi
Burmese democracy movements
Centrist parties in Asia
Internal conflict in Myanmar
Liberal conservative parties
Liberal parties in Myanmar
Political parties established in 1988

Political parties in Myanmar
Populist parties
Social liberal parties